Abacı is a village in the Amasya District, Amasya Province, in northern Turkey. Its population is 458 (2021).

Geography 
The village lies in the hills to the northeast of Göynücek. The Çekerek River flows to the west through Göynücek, up to the village of Şeyhler, northwest of Abacı.

Demographics
In 2012 the village had a population of 526 people. It has a declining population. In 1985 it had 1041 people, and in 2000 it had 728.

References

Villages in Amasya District